Peter Slater (born January 31, 1948) is a Canadian former professional ice hockey player. During the 1972–73 and 1973–74 seasons, Slater played 91 games in the World Hockey Association with the Los Angeles Sharks.

References

External links

1948 births
Living people
Canadian ice hockey centres
Des Moines Capitols players
Des Moines Oak Leafs players
Kalamazoo Wings (1974–2000) players
Los Angeles Sharks players
St. Lawrence Saints men's ice hockey players